The 1989 Paris–Nice was the 47th edition of the Paris–Nice cycle race and was held from 5 March to 12 March 1989. The race started in Paris and finished at the Col d'Èze. The race was won by Miguel Induráin of the Reynolds team.

Route

General classification

References

1989
1989 in road cycling
1989 in French sport
March 1989 sports events in Europe